Jurjaan Christiaan Koolen (20 September 1938 – 23 June 2020) was a Dutch volleyball player. He competed in the men's tournament at the 1964 Summer Olympics.

References

External links
 
 
 

1938 births
2020 deaths
Dutch men's volleyball players
Olympic volleyball players of the Netherlands
Volleyball players at the 1964 Summer Olympics
People from Monnickendam
Sportspeople from North Holland